Events in the year 1948 in Bulgaria.

Incumbents 

 General Secretaries of the Bulgarian Communist Party: Georgi Dimitrov
 Chairmen of the Council of Ministers: Georgi Dimitrov

Events 

 6 January – Balkantourist (the oldest still running Bulgarian tour operator) is established.

Sports

References 

 
1940s in Bulgaria
Years of the 20th century in Bulgaria
Bulgaria
Bulgaria